The Purvanchal Range, or Eastern Mountains, is a sub-mountain range of the Himalayas in northeast India. It lies south of the Brahmaputra valley.

Geography
The Purvanchal Range or Eastern Mountains are a sub-mountain range of Himalaya, covering an area of about 94,800 km2 with a population of over four million incorporates Nagaland, Manipur, Tripura and Mizoram Hills and Cachar Districts along with a fifth of Haf 
long tahsil of Assam State and District of Tripa and part of Lohit in Arunachal Pradesh.

The range is an eastern extension of the Himalayan Range System, in north eastern India.  It bends sharply to the south beyond the Dihang River gorge, and spreads along the eastern boundary of India with Myanmar.  The Purvanchal includes the hill of the Patkai hills, Naga Hills, Mizo Hills and Manipur hills.

Geology
The Purvanchal Mountains are composed largely of strong sandstone geological formations

References

See also
 
 

Mountain ranges of India
Mountain ranges of the Himalayas
Landforms of Assam
Landforms of Manipur
Landforms of Meghalaya
Landforms of Mizoram
Landforms of Nagaland
Landforms of Tripura
Northeast India